Marumakkathayam was a system of matrilineal inheritance prevalent in regions what now form part of the southern Indian state Kerala. Descent and the inheritance of property was traced through females. It was followed by all Nair castes, Ambalavasi  and tribal groups. The elder male was considered the head known as karanavar and the entire assets of the family were controlled by him as if he was the sole owner. The properties were not handed to his sons but to the daughters of his sons or to their sisters. 

The word literally means inheritance by sisters' children, as opposed to sons and daughters. 'Marumakkal', in the Malayalam language, means nephews and nieces. The joint family under the matrilineal system is known as Tharavad and formed the nucleus of the society in Malabar. The customary law of inheritance was codified by the Madras Marumakkathayam Act 1932, Madras Act No. 22 of 1933, published in the Fort St. George Gazette on 1 August 1933.

Malabar was part of the Madras Presidency in British India. In the Madras Marumakkathayam Act 1932, 'Marumakkathayam' is defined as the system of inheritance in which descent is traced by females, and 'Marumakkathayee' means a person governed by the Marumakkathayam law of inheritance. The system of inheritance is now abolished by The Joint Family System (Abolition) Act, 1975, by the Kerala State Legislature.

Modern changes and adaptations

By the beginning of the 20th century, marumakkathayam was increasingly seen as an undesirable remnant of a feudal past, and discontented groups including Nair men sought to bring reform. The reforms were pushed through in spite of opposition from conservative factions led by Kesava Pillai of Kandamath in the Travancore Court, Sree Mulam State Council and by leading members of society such as C. V. Raman Pillai in the states of Cochin and Travancore, and the British Indian province of Malabar, which later joined together to form Kerala in 1957.

See also
 Aliyasantana
 Matrilineal succession

References

Further reading

Kinship and descent
Culture of Kerala
Hindu law
Social history of Kerala
Family in India